FK Ústí nad Labem is a Czech football club based in the city of Ústí nad Labem. Currently the club plays in the Bohemian Football League.

The club has played at the top level of national football on three occasions, most recently in the 2010–11 season. However their joy was short-lived as they were immediately relegated.

History
The club was established in 1945 under the name SK Ústí nad Labem. It played in the Czechoslovak First League in 1952 and 1958–59 seasons. Ústí nad Labem played in the second league in the 1990s until withdrawing from the 1997–98 Czech 2. Liga, whereby their results were annulled and the team was automatically relegated. After having spent over 50 years outside the top flight, the club was promoted to the Czech First League in 2010. Ústí nad Labem only remained in the Czech First League for a single season as they were relegated immediately, returning to the Czech 2. Liga in 2011. Despite winning the 2. Liga in the 2011–12 season, the club were denied promotion by the league, due to their stadium not meeting its criteria.

Historical names
 1945 – SK Ústí nad Labem
 1947 – SK Slavia Ústí nad Labem
 1949 – Sokol Armaturka Ústí nad Labem
 1950 – ZSJ Armaturka Ústí nad Labem
 1953 – DSO Spartak Ústí nad Labem
 1962 – TJ Spartak Ústí nad Labem
 1977 – TJ Spartak Armaturka Ústí nad Labem
 1983 – TJ Spartak PS Ústí nad Labem
 1984 – TJ Spartak VHJ PS Ústí nad Labem
 1991 – FK Armaturka Ústí nad Labem
 1994 – FK GGS Arma Ústí nad Labem
 1999 – Merged with FK NRC Všebořice
 2001 – MFK Ústí nad Labem
 2006 – FK Ústí nad Labem

Stadium 
Ústí nad Labem's home stadium is Městský stadion. However, the stadium has a seated capacity of just 555, and as such does not meet the league requirements for the Czech First League. Therefore, during the 2010–11 season, the team played its home matches at Na Stínadlech in Teplice. When the club won the 2011–12 Czech 2. Liga, the team were not promoted to the Czech First League due to the issues with the stadium.

Honours
Czech 2. Liga (second tier)
 Champions (1): 2011–12
 Runners-Up (1): 2009–10
Bohemian Football League (third tier)
 Champions (2): 1993–94, 2003–04
Czech Fourth Division (fourth tier)
 Champions 2002–03

Players

Current squad
.

Out on loan

Management and technical staff

Managers and players

Head coaches in club's history

1993  František Plass
2002  Václav Rys
2004  Michal Zach
2005  Jiří Plíšek
2006  Václav Rys
2007  Libor Pala
2007  Svatopluk Habanec
2012  Přemysl Bičovský
2013  Lukáš Přerost
2014  Petr Němec
2016  Jiří Skála
2017  Aleš Křeček
2020  Juraj Šimurka (caretaker)
2020  Jiří Jarošík
2021  David Jarolím
2022  Martin Hašek
2022  Dušan Tesařík

Notable former players

History in domestic competitions

 Seasons spent at Level 1 of the football league system: 1
 Seasons spent at Level 2 of the football league system: 18
 Seasons spent at Level 3 of the football league system: 1
 Seasons spent at Level 4 of the football league system: 3
 Seasons spent at Level 5 of the football league system: 1

Czech Republic

References

External links
  

 
Football clubs in the Czech Republic
Association football clubs established in 1945
Czechoslovak First League clubs
Czech First League clubs
1945 establishments in Czechoslovakia